The BR Standard Class 2 2-6-0 is a class of steam locomotive, one of the British Railways Standard classes of the 1950s. They were physically the smallest of the Standard classes; 65 were built.

Overview
The design was derived from the Ivatt-designed Class 2 2-6-0, with a reduced cab to enable it to fit into a universal loading gauge, and other standard fittings, most notably a taller chimney, others including the lack of an Ivatt dome and side plates connecting the two sections of the engine. Like the LMS predecessor the BR design had a tender cab to enhance crew protection and visibility when running tender-first. They were all attached to a BR3 type tender. These locomotives are often known by the nickname "Mickey Mouse".

Construction
Darlington works was responsible for building the entire fleet of 65 engines and for a time construction of the LMS and BR designs overlapped. The last No. 78064 was completed in 1956 but the class remained intact for just seven years. Coincidentally the first to be withdrawn No. 78015 was a Darlington-based engine.

Route availability
Like the LMS counterpart, the Standard Mogul was arranged for a low axle-loading of just . This allowed it to operate on most lightly laid routes and secondary lines. The route availability was 3. Some of the class had speedometers fitted.

Reputation
Among crews the 2MT 2-6-0 gained a reputation for being very sure-footed. Some maintained however that the engine did not steam well. The loudest complaint was about the draughty and dirty footplate. This was surprising given the efforts of Robert Riddles and his team to optimise working conditions in the Standards' cab layout.

Shed allocations
Two former Lancashire and Yorkshire Railway sheds (Bank Hall (Liverpool) and Wigan (L&Y), respectively), designated 27A and 27D, received an allocation of the class. Bank Hall had 78041–44 which were used with great success on both slow and fast trains from Liverpool Exchange to either Preston, Bolton or Rochdale. The Wigan engines 78040/61–64 were used on stopping trains to Liverpool, Southport, Bolton and Rochdale. They replaced LMS Class 2P 4-4-0s and L&YR 2-4-2Ts. On the former L&Y lines this class was generally employed on passenger work whilst the LMS Class 2 2-6-0s were normally found on shunting and freight jobs until the mid-1960s. 

When the Cambrian section closed and other areas dieselised, other members of the class came to the former L&Y lines (some as replacements for those originally allocated to 27A and 27D). These included 78002 (in green livery), 78007, 78027 and 78057.  Some of these were used on shunting duties from Bolton and Lostock Hall sheds. Number 78022 preserved on the Keighley & Worth Valley Railway had a spell as Preston station passenger pilot whilst allocated to Lostock Hall.

Withdrawal

Preservation 
Four members of the class survived into preservation, however one member of the class (78059) is currently in the process of being converted to the tank version of the class.

Footnotes

Notes

References

Further reading 

 A Detailed History of BR Standard Steam Locomotives, - Vol 2 - The 4-6-0 and 2-6-0 Classes. RCTS

External links

steamlocomotive.info
78018
78019
78022
78059
Darlington Railway Preservation Society

2
2-6-0 locomotives
Railway locomotives introduced in 1952
Standard gauge steam locomotives of Great Britain